The Sarmatians were a large confederation of ancient Eastern Iranian equestrian nomadic peoples of classical antiquity who dominated the Pontic steppe from about the 3rd century BC to the 4th century AD.

Originating in the central parts of the Eurasian Steppe, the Sarmatians were part of the wider Scythian cultures. They started migrating westward around the fourth and third centuries BC, coming to dominate the closely related Scythians by 200 BC. At their greatest reported extent, around 100 BC, these tribes ranged from the Vistula River to the mouth of the Danube and eastward to the Volga, bordering the shores of the Black and Caspian seas as well as the Caucasus to the south.

In the first century AD, the Sarmatians began encroaching upon the Roman Empire in alliance with Germanic tribes. In the third century AD, their dominance of the Pontic Steppe was broken by the Germanic Goths. With the Hunnic invasions of the fourth century, many Sarmatians joined the Goths and other Germanic tribes (Vandals) in the settlement of the Western Roman Empire. Since large parts of today's Russia, specifically the land between the Ural Mountains and the Don River, were controlled in the fifth century BC by the Sarmatians, the Volga–Don and Ural steppes sometimes are called "Sarmatian Motherland."

The Sarmatians in the Bosporan Kingdom assimilated into the Greek civilization, while others were absorbed by the proto-Circassian Meot people, the Alans and the Goths. Other Sarmatians were assimilated and absorbed by the Early Slavs. A people related to the Sarmatians, known as the Alans, survived in the North Caucasus into the Early Middle Ages, ultimately giving rise to the modern Ossetic ethnic group.

Etymology

Nevertheless, historians often regarded these as two separate peoples, and archaeologists habitually use the term 'Sauromatian' to identify the earliest phase of Sarmatian culture. Though it was historically suggested that their name derives from the word lizard, linking to the Sarmatians' use of reptile-like scale armour and dragon standards, this almost certainly unfounded.

Oleg Trubachyov derived the name from the Indo-Aryan *sar-ma(n)t (feminine – rich in women, ruled by women), the Indo-Aryan and Indo-Iranian word *sar- (woman) and the Indo-Iranian adjective suffix -ma(n)t/wa(n)t. By that derivation was noted the high status of women (matriarchy), which was unusual from the Greek point of view and went to the invention of Amazons (the Greek name for Sarmatians was Sarmatai Gynaikokratoumenoi, ruled by women). 

The Sarmatians themselves apparently called themselves "Aryans", "Arii".

Location 
The territory inhabited by the Sarmatians, which was known as Sarmatia to Greco-Roman ethnographers, covered the western part of greater Scythia, and corresponded to today's Central Ukraine, South-Eastern Ukraine, Southern Russia, Russian Volga, and South-Ural regions, and to a smaller extent the northeastern Balkans and around Moldova.

History

Origin
The ethnogenesis of the Sarmatians occurred during the 4th to 3rd centuries BC, when Scythian-related nomads originating from the southern Ural foothills migrated southwest into the territory of the Sauromatians, between the lower Volga and Don rivers. Despite the similarity between the names Sarmatian and Sauromatian, modern authors distinguish between the two, since Sarmatian culture did not directly develop from the Sauromatian culture and the core of the Sarmatian culture was  composed of these newly arrived migrants.

In the Pontic Steppe and Europe
During the 4th and 3rd centuries BC, the centre of Sarmatian power remained north of the Caucasus and in the 3rd century BC the most important centres were around the lower Don, Kalmykia, the Kuban area, and the Central Caucasus.

They experienced another military setback after participating in the Bosporan Civil War in 309 BC and came under pressure from the Thracian  and the Germanic .

That the tribes formerly referred to by Herodotus as Scythians were now called Sarmatians by Hellenistic and Roman authors implies that the Sarmatian conquest did not involve a displacement of the Scythians from the Pontic Steppe, but rather that the Scythian tribes were absorbed by the Sarmatians. Meanwhile, the populations which still identified as Scythians proper became reduced to Crimea and the Dobruja region, and at one point the Crimean Scythians were the vassals of the Sarmatian queen .

The hegemony of the Sarmatians in the Pontic Steppe continued during the 1st century BC, when they were allied with the Scythians against , a general of  VI , before allying with  against the Romans and fighting for him in both Europe and Asia, demonstrating the Sarmatians' complete involvement in the affairs of the Pontic and Danubian regions. During the early part of the century, the  had migrated to the area to the northeast of the Lake . Meanwhile, the  moved westwards until they reached the Danube and the  moved into the area between the Dnipro and the Danube and from there further west. During the 1st century BC century, various Sarmatians reached the Pannonian Basin and the  passed through the territories corresponding to modern-day Moldavia and Wallachia before settling in the Tisza valley, by the middle of the century.

Between 50 and 60 CE, the  had appeared in the foothills of the Caucasus, from where they attacked the Caucasus and Transcaucasus areas and the Parthian Empire.

By the 2nd century AD, the  had conquered the steppes of the north Caucasus and of the north Black Sea area and created a powerful confederation of tribes under their rule. Under the hegemony of the  a trade route connected the Pontic Steppe, the southern Urals, and the region presently known as Western Turkestan.

Decline 

The hegemony of the Sarmatians in the steppes began to decline over the 2nd and 3rd centuries AD, when the Huns conquered Sarmatian territory in the Caspian Steppe and the Ural region. The supremacy of the Sarmatians was finally destroyed when the Germanic Goths migrating from the Baltic Sea region conquered the Pontic Steppe around 200 AD. As part of the Hunnic state, the  participated in the Huns' defeat and conquest of the kingdom of the Ostrogoths on the Pontic Steppe. Some free  fled into the mountains of the Caucasus, where they participated in the ethnogenesis of populations including the Ossetians and the Kabardians, and other Alan groupings survived in Crimea.

The Sarmatians in the Bosporan Kingdom assimilated into the Greek civilization. Others assimilated with the proto-Circassian Meot people, and may have influenced the Circassian language. Some Sarmatians were absorbed by the Alans and Goths. During the Early Middle Ages, the Proto-Slavic population of Eastern Europe assimilated and absorbed Sarmatians during the political upheavals of that era. However, a people related to the Sarmatians, known as the Alans, survived in the North Caucasus into the Early Middle Ages, ultimately giving rise to the modern Ossetic ethnic group.

Archaeology

In 1947, Soviet archaeologist Boris Grakov defined a culture flourishing from the 6th century BC to the 4th century AD, apparent in late kurgan graves (buried within earthwork mounds), sometimes reusing part of much older kurgans. It was a nomadic steppe culture ranging from the Black Sea eastward to beyond the Volga that is especially evident at two of the major sites at Kardaielova and Chernaya in the trans-Uralic steppe. The four phases – distinguished by grave construction, burial customs, grave goods, and geographical spread – are:
Sauromatian, 6th–5th centuries BC
Early Sarmatian, 4th–2nd centuries BC, also called the Prokhorovka culture
Middle Sarmatian, late 2nd century BC to late 2nd century AD
Late Sarmatian, late 2nd century AD to 4th century AD

While "Sarmatian" and "Sauromatian" are synonymous as ethnonyms, by convention they are given different meanings as archaeological technical terms. The term "Prokhorovka culture" derives from a complex of mounds in the Prokhorovski District, Orenburg region, excavated by S. I. Rudenko in 1916.

Reportedly, during 2001 and 2006 a great Late Sarmatian pottery centre was unearthed near Budapest, Hungary in the Üllő5 archaeological site. Typical grey, granular Üllő5 ceramics form a distinct group of Sarmatian pottery is found ubiquitously in the north-central part of the Great Hungarian Plain region, indicating a lively trading activity.

A 1998 paper on the study of glass beads found in Sarmatian graves suggests wide cultural and trade links.

Archaeological evidence suggests that Scythian-Sarmatian cultures may have given rise to the Greek legends of Amazons. Graves of armed women have been found in southern Ukraine and Russia. David Anthony noted that approximately 20% of Scythian-Sarmatian "warrior graves" on the lower Don and lower Volga contained women dressed for battle as warriors and he asserts that encountering that cultural phenomenon "probably inspired the Greek tales about the Amazons."

Ethnology

The Sarmatians were part of the Iranian steppe peoples, among whom were also Scythians and Saka. These also are grouped together as "East Iranians." Archaeology has established the connection 'between the Iranian-speaking Scythians, Sarmatians, and Saka and the earlier Timber-grave and Andronovo cultures'. Based on building construction, these three peoples were the likely descendants of those earlier archaeological cultures. The Sarmatians and Saka used the same stone construction methods as the earlier Andronovo culture. The Timber grave (Srubnaya culture) and Andronovo house building traditions were further developed by these three peoples. Andronovo pottery was continued by the Saka and Sarmatians. Archaeologists describe the Andronovo culture people as exhibiting pronounced Caucasoid features.

The first Sarmatians are mostly identified with the Prokhorovka culture, which moved from the southern Urals to the Lower Volga and then to the northern Pontic steppe, in the fourth–third centuries BC. During the migration, the Sarmatian population seems to have grown and they divided themselves into several groups, such as the Alans, Aorsi, Roxolani, and Iazyges. By 200 BC, the Sarmatians replaced the Scythians as the dominant people of the steppes. The Sarmatians and Scythians had fought on the Pontic steppe to the north of the Black Sea. The Sarmatians, described as a large confederation, were to dominate these territories over the next five centuries. According to Brzezinski and Mielczarek, the Sarmatians were formed between the Don River and the Ural Mountains. Pliny the Elder wrote that they ranged from the Vistula River (in present-day Poland) to the Danube.

Culture

Language

The Sarmatians spoke an Iranian language that was derived from 'Old Iranian' and was heterogenous. By the first century BC, the Iranian tribes in what is today South Russia spoke different languages or dialects, clearly distinguishable. According to a group of Iranologists writing in 1968, the numerous Iranian personal names in Greek inscriptions from the Black Sea coast indicate that the Sarmatians spoke a North-Eastern Iranian dialect ancestral to Alanian-Ossetian. However, Harmatta (1970) argued that "the language of the Sarmatians or that of the Alans as a whole cannot be simply regarded as being Old Ossetian."

Equipment
The Roxolani, who were one of the earlier Sarmatian tribes to have migrated into Europe and therefore were among the more geographically western Sarmatians, used helmets and corselets made of raw ox hide, and wicker shields, as well as spears, bows, and swords. The Roxolani adopted these forms of armour and weaponry from the Germanic Bastarnae near whom they lived.

Genetics

In a study conducted in 2014 by Gennady Afanasiev, et al., from the Institute of Archaeology of the Russian Academy of Sciences, DNA was extracted from bone fragments found in seven out of ten Alanic burials on the Don River. Four of them turned out to belong to Y-DNA Haplogroup G2 and six of them possessed mtDNA haplogroup I.

In 2015, the Institute of Archaeology in Moscow conducted research on various Sarmato-Alan and Saltovo-Mayaki culture Kurgan burials. In these analyses, the two Alan samples from the fourth to sixth century AD turned out to belong to Y-DNA haplogroups G2a-P15 and R1a-Z94, while two of the three Sarmatian samples from the second to third century AD were found to belong to Y-DNA haplogroup J1-M267 while one belonged to R1a. Three Saltovo-Mayaki samples from the eighth to ninth century AD turned out to have Y-DNA corresponding to haplogroups G, J2a-M410 and R1a-z94.

A genetic study published in Nature Communications in March 2017 examined several Sarmatian individuals buried in Pokrovka, Russia (southwest of the Ural Mountains) between the fifth century BC and the second century BC. The sample of Y-DNA extracted belonged to haplogroup R1b1a2a2. This was the dominant lineage among males of the earlier Yamnaya culture. The eleven samples of mtDNA extracted belonged to the haplogroups U3, M, U1a'c, T, F1b, N1a1a1a1a, T2, U2e2, H2a1f, T1a, and U5a1d2b. The Sarmatians examined were found to be closely related to peoples of the earlier Yamnaya culture and to the Poltavka culture.

A genetic study published in Nature in May 2018 examined the remains of twelve Sarmatians buried between 400 BC and 400 AD. The five samples of Y-DNA extracted belonged to haplogroup R1a1, I2b, R (two samples), and R1. The eleven samples of mtDNA extracted belonged to C4a1a, U4a2 (two samples), C4b1, I1, A, U2e1h (two samples), U4b1a4, H28, and U5a1.

A genetic study published in Science Advances in October 2018 examined the remains of five Sarmatians buried between 55 AD and 320 AD. The three samples of Y-DNA extracted belonged to haplogroup R1a1a and R1b1a2a2 (two samples), while the five samples of mtDNA extracted belonged to haplogroup H2a1, T1a1, U5b2b (two samples), and D4q.

A genetic study published in Current Biology in July 2019 examined the remains of nine Sarmatians. The five samples of Y-DNA extracted belonged to haplogroup Q1c-L332, R1a1e-CTS1123, R1a-Z645 (two samples), and E2b1-PF6746, while the nine samples of mtDNA extracted belonged to haplogroup W, W3a, T1a1, U5a2, U5b2a1a2, T1a1d, C1e, U5b2a1a1, U5b2c, and U5b2c.

A archaeogenetic study published in Cell in 2022, analyzed 17 Late Sarmatian samples from 4-5th century AD from the Pannonian Basin in Hungary. The nine extraced Y-DNA belonged to a diverse set of haplogroups, 2x I2a1b1a2b1-CTS4348, 2x I1a2a1a1a-Z141, I1a-DF29, G2a1-FGC725, E1b1b-L142.1, R1a1a1b2a2a1-Z2123 and R1b1a1b1a1a2b-PF6570, while the mtDNA haplogroups C5, H, 2x H1, H5, H7, H40, H59, HV0 I1, J1, 2x K1a, T1a, 2x T2b, U2.

Physical appearance
The Roman author Ovid recorded that one of the Sarmatian tribes, the Coralli, had blond hair, which is a characteristic that Ammianus Marcellinus also ascribed to the Alans. He wrote that nearly all of the Alani were "of great stature and beauty, their hair is somewhat yellow, their eyes are frighteningly fierce."

Modern historians have offered conflicting opinions about the description of the Alans as being tall and having blond hair. For instance, Roger Batty has posited that "presumably, only some of the Alans would have been blond". Bernard Bachrach has likewise suggested that because the Alans assimilated so many foreigners, the majority of them are unlikely to have been blond-haired, and that there was no distinguishing physical characteristic of the Alans. However, John Day has argued that Bachrach's analysis is flawed, because he mistranslated the original passage from Ammianus Marcellinus, and that the majority of the Alans were in fact blond. Iver Neumann has suggested that the description of Alans as blond may mean that their Indo-Iranian ancestry was greater than it was in the Huns. Charles Previté-Orton wrote that the Alans were only partly of Iranian heritage, and that the other part of their ancestry came from captive women and slaves.

Sarmatism 

Sarmatism (or Sarmatianism) is an ethno-cultural concept with a shade of politics designating the formation of an idea of the origin of Poland from Sarmatians within the Polish–Lithuanian Commonwealth. It was the dominant Baroque culture and ideology of the nobility (szlachta) that existed in times of the Renaissance to the eighteenth centuries. Together with another concept of "Golden Liberty," it formed a central aspect of the Commonwealth's culture and society. At its core was the unifying belief that the people of the Polish Commonwealth descended from the ancient Iranic Sarmatians, the legendary invaders of Slavic lands in antiquity.

Tribes
Alans
Roxolani
Iazyges
Ossetians
Jasz people
Aorsi
Arcaragantes
Hamaxobii (possibly)
Limigantes
Saii
Serboi
Siraces
Spali
Taifals (possibly)

See also
 List of ancient Iranian peoples
 Andronovo culture 
 Alans
 Cimmerians
 Early Slavs

References

Sources

Books

Journals

External links

 
 Ptolemaic Map (Digital Scriptorium) 
 Kurgans, Ritual Sites, and Settlements: Eurasian Bronze and Iron Age
Nomadic Art of the Eastern Eurasian Steppes, an exhibition catalog from The Metropolitan Museum of Art (fully available online as PDF), which contains material on Sarmatians

Sarmatians
Historical Iranian peoples
Bosporan Kingdom
History of the North Caucasus]
Peoples of the Caucasus
Ancient tribes in Ukraine
Ancient peoples of Ukraine
History of the western steppe
History of Eastern Europe
Tribes in Greco-Roman historiography
Ancient history of Romania
History of the Balkans
History of Ural
Saltovo-Mayaki culture
Archaeological cultures of Asia
Archaeological cultures of Eastern Europe
Archaeological cultures of Southeastern Europe